"Gold" is a song by musician Britt Nicole from her fourth album, Gold. It was released on November 13, 2012 as her debut mainstream single on Capitol Records.

Background and composition 
This song was produced by Dan Muckala, and was written by Muckala, Jess Cates, B.K. Irish and Britt Nicole.

Commercial performance 
As of July 19, 2013, the song has sold 169,000 copies in the US. However, on March 5, 2014 the song was certified Gold by the RIAA for sales over 500,000. This was Nicole's first song to chart the Billboard Hot 100, peaking at No. 83.

Music video 
The official video for the song premiered on November 29, 2012 and has received rotation on Disney Channel, TeenNick, and MTV. The video shows several high school teens who are not 'normal', in this sense being a Goth girl who self harms, a guy who dances ballet, a bulimic, a girl who likes to skateboard, and a young boy who is deemed too short to play basketball. They are all drawn to a gold light and drop into a world with several different teens, where they go to a mansion and find their people.

The music video is intercut with clips of Nicole singing and holding balloons in a hedge maze.

Track listing

Digital Single
Gold

Digital EP
Gold
Gold (Jason Nevins Rhythmic Radio Remix)
Gold (Wideboys Remix)

Charts

Weekly charts

Year-end charts

References 

2012 singles
Britt Nicole songs
Capitol Records singles
Songs written by Dan Muckala
Songs written by Jess Cates
2012 songs
Sparrow Records singles